Scott Edward Solomon (born November 5, 1988) is a former American football linebacker who played in the National Football League (NFL). He was selected in the seventh round, 211th overall, by the Tennessee Titans in the 2012 NFL Draft. He played college football at Rice.

Professional career

Tennessee Titans
Solomon was selected in the seventh round, 211th overall, by the Tennessee Titans in the 2012 NFL Draft. He made four tackles in his rookie season. He was released by the Titans on August 31, 2013.

New York Jets
Solomon was claimed off waivers by the New York Jets on September 1, 2013. He was released on September 10, 2013. He was re-signed six days later. He was released on October 4, 2013 after the Jets claimed tight end Zach Sudfeld off waivers.

Tampa Bay Buccaneers
Solomon signed with the Tampa Bay Buccaneers on December 26, 2013. He was released by the Buccaneers on September 9, 2014 and re-signed by the team on September 12, 2014. He was released by the Buccaneers on October 21, 2014.

Cleveland Browns
Solomon was signed to the Cleveland Browns' practice squad on November 18, 2014. He was promoted to the active roster on December 20, 2014. 

On October 14, 2015, Solomon was placed on injured reserve.

On April 4, Solomon signed with the Cleveland Browns as a restricted free agent.

On May 2, 2016, Solomon was released.

References

External links
 Tampa Bay Buccaneers bio
 Tennessee Titans bio
 Rice Owls bio

1988 births
Living people
American football defensive ends
American football linebackers
Cleveland Browns players
New York Jets players
Rice Owls football players
Tampa Bay Buccaneers players
Tennessee Titans players
Players of American football from San Antonio